Harry Haddon (1871 – after 1896) was an English professional footballer who played in the Football League for Small Heath.

Haddon was born in Pelsall, Staffordshire. A bustling centre forward, he played local football for Pelsall Villa and Lichfield Barracks before joining Small Heath. He made his debut in the First Division on 22 February 1896 in a 4–1 defeat at Bolton Wanderers, and scored twice in the next four games, but the selectors preferred Jack Jones. Haddon died in Walsall, Staffordshire.

References

1871 births
Year of death missing
People from Pelsall
Sportspeople from Walsall
English footballers
Association football forwards
Pelsall Villa F.C. players
Birmingham City F.C. players
Walsall Wood F.C. players
English Football League players
Date of birth missing